"Save Me" is a song by American alternative rock band Remy Zero. Taken from their album The Golden Hum, it reached number 27 on the United States Billboard Modern Rock charts, and acted as the theme song for the Superman-based television series Smallville. In a callback to Smallville, the song was later used on The Flash episode Elseworlds, Part 1, which featured part of the original Smallville set.

The shorter version of this song is from the Smallville compilation CD: Smallville: The Talon Mix (2003). The Season 1 finale, titled "Tempest", features Remy Zero appearing at the Spring Formal and performing the theme version of "Save Me"  and "Perfect Memory (I'll Remember You)".

Music video
The music video for "Save Me", directed by Phil Harder, was filmed in Minneapolis, Minnesota and features clips of downtown Minneapolis, Minnesota State Fairgrounds and of the bridges along the Mississippi River, including the I-35W Mississippi River bridge, which collapsed in August 2007.

In the music video, Cinjun Tate is different from everyone else. Everyone around him walks in reverse and cars drive backwards. The band performs inside a giant room with background projections of unrelated images (a lizard for example). In the end, everyone who walked backwards stops. Tate looks around, later shrugs, and walks backwards the same as everyone else before the video fades to black.

Track listing

Smallville single – Intro
 "Save Me" – 0:51

Charts

Notes

 Besant, Janna: "A Super Soundtrack from 'Smallville'" The Buffalo News, April 30, 2003.
 CNET Networks Entertainment: "Smallville: Tempest (1)", TV.com, May 21, 2002.

2000 songs
2001 singles
Remy Zero songs
Geffen Records singles
Television drama theme songs
Smallville
Superman music
Song recordings produced by Jack Joseph Puig
Music videos directed by Phil Harder